The Concept is the third album by the American funk band Slave, released in 1978. The album reached number eleven on Billboard's Top Soul Albums chart. This was the band's first album to include Steve Arrington and Starleana Young on vocals.

Track listing 
"Stellar Fungk" (8:43)
"The Way You Love Is Heaven" (4:33)
"Thank You Lord" (1:31)
"Drac Is Back" (3:59)
"We've Got Your Party" (4:49)
"Just Freak" (7:56)
"Coming Soon" (6:20)

Charts

Singles

References

External links
 Slave - The Concept at Discogs

1978 albums
Slave (band) albums
Cotillion Records albums